Kings Newton is a village in South Derbyshire. The population of the village is included in Melbourne.  The Holy well (pictured) was constructed around 1660, but has been refurbished at the end of the twentieth century.

History
Unlike many villages in Derbyshire, Kings Newton is not mentioned in the Domesday book and is a "new town". Originally the hamlet was called Newton but the prefix of Kings was added to differentiate it from other Newtons in the surrounding counties.

After the successful campaign at the Battle of Sobraon, Henry Hardinge was created Viscount Hardinge of Lahore and of King's Newton in Derbyshire, with a pension of £3000 for three lives. Why this small village was chosen for his honour is unclear.

The hall illustrated was built in 1560 and was extensively damaged by fire in 1859. It was fully restored in 1910 by Cecil Paget and his first wife. The illustration is from a book of poetry by local naturalist, John Joseph Briggs, whose poem about the Trent was the title of his poetry book.

Notable residents
 Marjorie Bates, 20th century artist was born here in 1883.
 John Joseph Briggs, Naturalist lived here and published a History of Melbourne
 Cecil Paget, locomotive engineer and railway administrator, lived in the Hall 1910-1936

See also
Listed buildings in Melbourne, Derbyshire

References

External links

Villages in Derbyshire
Melbourne, Derbyshire
Holy wells in England